The 2010 SFL premiership season was an Australian Rules Football competition staged across Southern Tasmania, Australia over twenty roster rounds and six finals series matches between 2 April and 18 September 2010.
From this season, the SFL would make KGV Football Park at Glenorchy its administration base and principal venue.

Participating Clubs
 Brighton Football Club
 Central Hawks Football Club
 Claremont Football Club
 Cygnet Football Club
 Dodges Ferry Football Club
 Huonville Lions Football Club
 Lindisfarne Football Club
 Kingborough Football Club
 New Norfolk Eagles Football Club
 Sorell Football Club
 Triabunna Football Club

2010 SFL Club Coaches
 Craig Stevenson (Brighton)
 Andrew Fehlberg (Central Hawks)
 Dean King (Claremont)
 Gary Williamson (Cygnet)
 Danny Ling (Dodges Ferry)
 Michael McGregor (Huonville Lions)
 Justin Rainbird (Lindisfarne)
 Adam Henley (Kingborough)
 Anthony McConnon (New Norfolk)
 Scott Allen (Sorell)
 Wayne McNamara (Triabunna)

SFL Leading Goalkickers
 Clint Curtain (Claremont) – 87
 Darren Garth (Huonville Lions) – 85
 Ricky Martin (New Norfolk) – 72
 Michael McGregor (Huonville Lions) – 63
 Brett Booth (New Norfolk) - 61

Medal Winners
 James Lange (Huonville Lions) – William Leitch Medal
 Dale Fenton (Brighton), Michael Wiggins (Dodges Ferry) & Steve Hall (Claremont) – George Watt Medal (Reserves)
 Brad Coppleman (New Norfolk) – Lipscombe Medal (Under 18's)
 Matthew Smith (New Norfolk) – Tony Martyn Medal (Best player in SFL Grand Final)

SFL Reserves Grand Final
Kingborough 16.17 (113) d Claremont 2.5 (17) at KGV Football Park

SFL Under-18's Grand Final
New Norfolk 14.7 (91) d Kingborough 8.8 (56) at KGV Football Park

Representative Match
(Saturday, 12 June 2010) 
NTFA: 3.6 (24) | 6.9 (45) | 9.12 (66) | 12.15 (87) 
SFL: 0.0 (0) | 4.7 (31) | 6.11 (47) | 7.11 (53) 
Attendance: N/A at KGV Football Park.

2010 SFL Ladder

Round 1
(Friday, 2 April & Saturday, 3 April 2010) 
Kingborough 14.14 (98) d Brighton 14.6 (90) at Pontville Oval (Friday Night) 
Claremont 17.9 (111) d Sorell 12.11 (83) at Abbotsfield Park. 
New Norfolk 19.9 (123) d Dodges Ferry 15.9 (99) at Boyer Oval. 
Central Hawks 12.13 (85) d Cygnet 6.10 (46) at Cygnet Oval. 
Lindisfarne 26.24 (180) d Triabunna 8.8 (56) at Triabunna Recreation Ground. 
Bye: Huonville Lions.

Round 2
(Saturday, 10 April 2010) 
Cygnet 21.13 (139) d Claremont 15.10 (100) at Abbotsfield Park 
New Norfolk 33.21 (219) d Lindisfarne 17.9 (111) at Anzac Park 
Huonville Lions 19.16 (130) d Sorell 9.11 (65) at Huonville Recreation Ground 
Kingborough 36.32 (248) d Triabunna 5.4 (34) at Kingston Beach Oval 
Central Hawks 20.16 (136) d Brighton 15.8 (98) at Pontville Oval 
Bye: Dodges Ferry.

Round 3
(Saturday, 17 April 2010) 
New Norfolk 21.13 (139) d Kingborough 10.6 (66) at Boyer Oval 
Huonville Lions 23.10 (148) d Cygnet 10.7 (67) at Cygnet Oval 
Brighton 21.12 (138) d Claremont 14.12 (96) at Pontville Oval 
Dodges Ferry 25.24 (174) d Lindisfarne 7.8 (50) at Shark Park 
Central Hawks 25.20 (170) d Triabunna 5.9 (39) at Triabunna Recreation Ground 
Bye: Sorell.

Round 4
(Saturday, 24 April 2010) 
Claremont 20.17 (137) d Triabunna 2.6 (18) at Abbotsfield Park 
New Norfolk 17.12 (114) d Central Hawks 10.12 (72) at Bothwell Oval 
Huonville Lions 14.14 (98) d Brighton 7.11 (53) at Huonville Recreation Ground 
Dodges Ferry 23.11 (149) d Kingborough 7.11 (53) at Kingston Beach Oval 
Cygnet 5.7 (37) d Sorell 5.5 (35) at Pembroke Park 
Bye: Lindisfarne.

Round 5
(Saturday, 1 May 2010) 
Kingborough 20.14 (134) d Lindisfarne 13.9 (87) at Anzac Park 
New Norfolk 32.11 (203) d Claremont 12.3 (75) at Boyer Oval 
Sorell 15.14 (104) d Brighton 12.7 (79) at Pontville Oval 
Dodges Ferry 21.23 (149) d Central Hawks 13.4 (82) at Shark Park 
Huonville Lions 33.31 (229) d Triabunna 3.6 (24) at Triabunna Recreation Ground 
Bye: Cygnet.

Round 6
(Saturday, 8 May 2010) 
Dodges Ferry 21.19 (145) v Claremont 8.3 (51) at Abbotsfield Park 
Cygnet 16.2 (98) d Brighton 12.17 (89) at Cygnet Oval 
New Norfolk 21.9 (135) d Huonville Lions 16.11 (107) at Huonville Recreation Ground 
Lindisfarne 15.11 (101) d Central Hawks 14.9 (93) at Oatlands Oval 
Sorell 23.17 (155) d Triabunna 6.4 (40) at Pembroke Park 
Bye: Kingborough.

Round 7
(Saturday, 15 May 2010) 
Lindisfarne 14.15 (99) d Claremont 11.12 (78) at Anzac Park 
New Norfolk 22.18 (150) d Sorell 9.5 (59) at Boyer Oval 
Kingborough 14.18 (102) d Central Hawks 12.7 (79) at Kingston Beach Oval 
Dodges Ferry 29.11 (185) d Huonville Lions 15.7 (97) at Shark Park 
Cygnet 27.25 (187) d Triabunna 5.5 (35) at Triabunna Recreation Ground 
Bye: Brighton

Round 8
(Saturday, 22 May 2010) 
Brighton 39.23 (257) d Triabunna 1.1 (7) – Pontville Oval 
Kingborough 25.14 (164) d Claremont 11.10 (76) at Abbotsfield Park 
Dodges Ferry 22.19 (151) d Sorell 2.3 (15) at Pembroke Park 
Huonville Lions 13.6 (84) d Lindisfarne 10.5 (65) at Huonville Recreation Ground 
New Norfolk 19.23 (137) d Cygnet 6.6 (42) at Cygnet Oval 
Bye: Central Hawks

Round 9
(Saturday, 29 May 2010) 
Lindisfarne 12.14 (86) d Sorell 10.9 (69) at Anzac Park 
Kingborough 12.20 (92) d Huonville Lions 7.7 (49) at Kingston Beach Oval 
Dodges Ferry 31.19 (205) d Cygnet 9.9 (63) at Shark Park 
New Norfolk 25.25 (175) d Brighton 1.11 (17) at Boyer Oval 
Central Hawks 24.16 (160) d Claremont 15.7 (97) at Bothwell Oval 
Bye: Triabunna

Round 10
(Saturday, 5 June 2010) 
Dodges Ferry 17.16 (118) d Brighton 11.9 (75) at Pontville Oval 
Kingborough 16.18 (114) d Sorell 8.13 (61) at Pembroke Park 
Lindisfarne 9.15 (69) d Cygnet 6.11 (47) at Cygnet Oval 
New Norfolk 40.36 (276) d Triabunna 4.5 (29) at Triabunna Recreation Ground 
Huonville Lions 15.7 (97) d Central Hawks 12.6 (78) at Huonville Recreation Ground 
Bye: Claremont

Round 11
(Saturday, 19 June 2010) 
Huonville Lions 12.15 (87) d Claremont 7.11 (53) at Abbotsfield Park 
Lindisfarne 15.13 (103) d Brighton 13.7 (85) at Anzac Park 
Central Hawks 16.16 (112) d Sorell 5.7 (37) at Oatlands Oval 
Dodges Ferry 23.35 (173) d Triabunna 4.4 (28) at Port Arthur Recreation Ground 
Kingborough 15.15 (105) d Cygnet 12.11 (83) at Kingston Beach Oval 
Bye: New Norfolk

Round 12
(Saturday, 26 June 2010) 
Dodges Ferry 16.16 (112) d New Norfolk 13.11 (89) at Shark Park 
Claremont 18.21 (129) d Sorell 10.7 (67) at Abbotsfield Park 
Lindisfarne 25.28 (178) d Triabunna 2.3 (15) at Anzac Park 
Kingborough 15.20 (110) d Brighton 8.10 (58) at Kingston Beach Oval 
Central Hawks 21.16 (142) d Cygnet 9.6 (60) at Bothwell Oval 
Bye: Huonville Lions.

Round 13
(Saturday, 3 July 2010) 
New Norfolk 17.13 (115) d Lindisfarne 11.5 (71) at Boyer Oval 
Central Hawks 12.14 (86) d Brighton 8.6 (54) at Pontville Oval 
Huonville Lions 18.16 (124) d Sorell 7.7 (49) at Pembroke Park 
Claremont 18.12 (120) d Cygnet 17.12 (114) at Cygnet Oval 
Kingborough 24.20 (164) d Triabunna 15.4 (94) at Triabunna Recreation Ground 
Bye: Dodges Ferry

Round 14
(Saturday, 10 July 2010) 
Claremont 15.11 (101) d Brighton 8.19 (67) at Abbotsfield Park 
Dodges Ferry 19.20 (134) d Lindisfarne 7.3 (45) at Anzac Park 
New Norfolk 15.16 (106) d Kingborough 11.19 (85) at Kingston Beach Oval 
Huonville Lions 10.18 (78) d Cygnet 10.6 (66) at Huonville Recreation Ground 
Central Hawks 32.19 (211) d Triabunna 9.5 (59) at Oatlands Oval 
Bye: Sorell

Round 15
(Saturday, 17 July 2010) 
New Norfolk 23.15 (153) d Central Hawks 7.5 (47) at Boyer Oval 
Huonville Lions 15.18 (108) d Brighton 4.12 (36) at Pontville Oval 
Dodges Ferry 14.17 (101) d Kingborough 12.8 (80) at Shark Park 
Cygnet 13.9 (87) d Sorell 4.12 (36) at Kermandie Oval 
Claremont 29.15 (189) d Triabunna 7.14 (56) at Triabunna Recreation Ground 
Bye: Lindisfarne.

Round 16
(Saturday, 24 July 2010) 
Huonville Lions 57.20 (362) d Triabunna 0.3 (3) at Huonville Recreation Ground 
Kingborough 24.14 (158) d Lindisfarne 10.8 (68) at Kingston Beach Oval 
Dodges Ferry 19.9 (123) d Central Hawks 10.6 (66) at Bothwell Oval 
Brighton 17.10 (112) d Sorell 10.7 (67) at Pembroke Park 
Bye: New Norfolk, Cygnet & Claremont.

Round 17
(Saturday, 31 July 2010) 
Central Hawks 22.14 (146) d Lindisfarne 9.11 (65) at Anzac Park 
New Norfolk 21.10 (136) d Huonville Lions 13.5 (83) at Boyer Oval 
Brighton 18.8 (116) d Cygnet 5.14 (44) at Pontville Oval 
Dodges Ferry 18.21 (129) d Claremont 12.7 (79) at Shark Park 
Sorell 26.14 (170) d Triabunna 11.9 (75) at Triabunna Recreation Ground 
Bye: Kingborough.

Round 18
(Saturday, 7 August 2010) 
New Norfolk 27.13 (175) d Sorell 11.5 (71) at Pembroke Park 
Lindisfarne 14.11 (95) d Claremont 10.12 (72) at Anzac Park 
Dodges Ferry 8.13 (61) d Huonville Lions 8.10 (58) at Huonville Recreation Ground 
Central Hawks 12.6 (78) d Kingborough 10.15 (75) at Oatlands Oval 
Cygnet 29.22 (196) d Triabunna 0.4 (4) at Cygnet Oval 
Bye: Brighton.

Round 19
(Saturday, 14 August 2010) 
New Norfolk 17.27 (129) d Cygnet 7.2 (44) at Boyer Oval 
Huonville Lions 15.10 (100) d Lindisfarne 4.4 (28) at Anzac Park 
Kingborough 26.14 (170) d Claremont 13.9 (87) at Kingston Beach Oval 
Dodges Ferry 33.13 (211) d Sorell 7.13 (55) at Shark Park 
Brighton 22.14 (146) d Triabunna 10.11 (71) at Triabunna Recreation Ground 
Bye: Central Hawks.

Round 20
(Saturday, 21 August 2010) 
Central Hawks 17.13 (115) d Claremont 9.4 (58) at Abbotsfield Park 
New Norfolk 23.18 (156) d Brighton 2.6 (18) at Pontville Oval 
Lindisfarne 15.11 (101) d Sorell 7.9 (51) at Pembroke Park 
Huonville Lions 14.12 (96) d Kingborough 10.11 (71) at Huonville Recreation Ground 
Dodges Ferry 13.15 (93) d Cygnet 3.3 (21) at Cygnet Oval 
Bye: Triabunna.

First Elimination Final
(Saturday, 28 August 2010) 
Huonville Lions: 2.7 (19) | 9.9 (63) | 12.12 (84) | 19.17 (131) 
Lindisfarne: 3.1 (19) | 4.2 (26) | 5.2 (32) | 6.3 (39) 
Attendance: N/A at Huonville Recreation Ground.

Second Elimination Final
(Saturday, 28 August 2010) 
Kingborough: 4.7 (31) | 5.10 (40) | 10.18 (78) | 16.23 (119) 
Central Hawks: 5.2 (32) | 7.8 (50) | 7.9 (51) | 12.12 (84) 
Attendance: N/A at Kingston Beach Oval.

First Semi Final
(Saturday, 4 September 2010) 
Huonville Lions: 5.1 (31) | 5.5 (35) | 7.5 (47) | 7.7 (49) 
Kingborough: 3.2 (20) | 5.5 (35) | 5.7 (37) | 5.7 (37) 
Attendance: N/A at Huonville Recreation Ground.

Second Semi Final
(Saturday, 4 September 2010) 
New Norfolk: 2.1 (13) | 5.5 (35) | 6.6 (42) | 8.12 (60) 
Dodges Ferry: 5.3 (33) | 5.5 (35) | 5.7 (37) | 6.8 (44) 
Attendance: N/A at Boyer Oval.

Preliminary Final
(Saturday, 11 September 2010) 
Dodges Ferry: 3.5 (23) | 5.5 (35) | 10.11 (71) | 15.13 (103) 
Huonville Lions: 0.1 (1) | 4.2 (26) | 5.5 (35) | 8.8 (56) 
Attendance: N/A at KGV Football Park.

Grand Final
(Saturday, 18 September 2010) 
New Norfolk: 6.1 (37) | 8.9 (57) | 14.13 (97) | 20.18 (138) 
Dodges Ferry: 1.3 (9) | 5.4 (34) | 6.5 (41) | 10.6 (66) 
Attendance: 5,203 at KGV Football Park.

External links 
 Official Website

2010
2010 in Australian rules football